Leonard Rodway   (5 October 1853 – 9 March 1936) was an English-born Australian dentist and botanist.

Early life
Rodway was born in Torquay Devon, England, the thirteenth child of Henry Barron Rodway, a dentist and inventor of the Rodway life buoy, and his wife Elizabeth, née Allin. Leonard Rodway was educated in Birmingham and aboard the Thames Nautical Training College ship, Worcester, obtaining double first-class certificates. He served for three years as a midshipman in the merchant service, but decided to follow his father into dentistry. He obtained the licentiateship of the Royal College of Surgeons, London in 1878.

Career
Rodway emigrated to Australia and settled in Hobart, Tasmania. Rodway was registered under the first Tasmanian Dental Act 1884, but is mainly remembered for his interest in botany. In 1896 he was appointed honorary government botanist for Tasmania, and held this position for 36 years. His work in this connexion was largely done at week-ends and during his holidays.

He was elected a trustee of the Tasmanian Museum, and Botanical Gardens, in 1911, and became director of the latter in 1928, when he pressed for a more scientific role for the Gardens, deprecating their use as solely for public recreation. Rodway was chairman of the Field Naturalists' Club, the national park board, and was on the fisheries and the technical schools and other boards. He acted as an advisory officer to the forestry department and was for some years lecturer in botany at the University of Tasmania. He also did valuable work for the museum and botanical gardens.

In 1930, Rodway assisted Harold Comber in his plant hunting expedition, during which 147 Tasmanian species were collected and despatched to the UK.  Failing health caused his retirement in 1932.

Works
From 1892 to 1928 Rodway presented scientific papers, principally to the Royal Society of Tasmania to which he was elected in 1884, and published The Tasmanian Flora (Hobart, 1903), a standard reference for forty years, Some Wild Flowers of Tasmania (Hobart, 1910) and Tasmanian Bryophyta (Hobart, 1914–16). He also compiled a complete description of the mosses and hepatics of Tasmania, and contributed numerous papers to the Papers and Proceedings of the Royal Society of Tasmania. His botanical library was presented to the Royal Society of Tasmania by his widow.

Honours and awards
Rodway was made a Companion of the Order of St Michael and St George in the 1917 New Year Honours. He was awarded the Clarke Medal of the Royal Society of New South Wales in 1924, and the first Royal Society of Tasmania medal in 1928.

Eponymy
Rodway has been honoured in the specific names of the fungi Calostoma rodwayi and Entoloma rodwayi, as well the following plants:

 Carpha rodwayi
 Deyeuxia rodwayi
Eucalyptus rodwayi
 Gahnia rodwayi
 Ozothamnus rodwayi
 Poa rodwayi
 Thismia rodwayi

A mountain range in Mount Field National Park, Tasmania, the Rodway Range, is also named in his honour.

Personal life
Rodway married Louisa Susan Phillips, a dentist's daughter, in Brisbane on 19 May 1879. They had five sons and a daughter, Florence Rodway, who became a successful portrait painter. She is represented in the national galleries at Sydney and Hobart, and in the Commonwealth collection at Canberra. Louisa died in 1922, and the following year he married Olive Barnard, an amateur naturalist whose photographs had illustrated Some Wild Flowers of Tasmania.

Leonard Rodway was the father of the physician-botanist Frederick Arthur Rodway and the paternal grandfather of the botanist Gwenda Louise Davis (née Rodway).

Death
Rodway died aged 82 on 9 March 1936 at Kingston. He was buried with Church of England rites at Cornelian Bay Cemetery.

References

 
Ann Elias, 'Rodway, Leonard (1853 - 1936)', Australian Dictionary of Biography, Volume 11, MUP, 1988, pp 436–437. Retrieved 10 November 2009

1853 births
1936 deaths
20th-century Australian botanists
Australian dentists
Australian people of English descent
Companions of the Order of St Michael and St George
Burials in Tasmania
19th-century Australian botanists